Gavmir (also Romanized as Gāvmīr; also known as Gāmīr) is a village in Sardasht Rural District, Sardasht District, Dezful County, Khuzestan Province, Iran. At the 2006 census, its population was 959, in 160 families.

References 

Populated places in Dezful County